Dmitry Yakovlevich Pokrass (born on 7 November 1899 in Kiev – died on 20 December 1978 in Moscow) was a Soviet composer of Jewish origin. He composed popular music and scores for the theatre and films. Dmitry Pokrass was recognized in 1975 as a People's Artist of the USSR. (See also Pokrass brothers)

Biography

Early Years and Education 
At eight years of age, Dmitry Pokrass began performing as a means of earning money. He declaimed poetry, beating off a chechotka. Touring cities, he absorbed the music of the suburbs of old Kiev, of military bands, Jewish weddings and celebrations, the cinema, synagogue services, and cheerful Ukrainian dances. During the years 1914–1917, Pokrass studied piano at the Petrograd Conservatory. As a student, he composed romances and songs for actors of a variety show. Has published a series of romances "Irmochka" ("The Grimaces of Life") with the description: "Intimate cabaret songs in the style of Isa Kremer, Vertinsky, Sabinin, Henkin". In the music of romances, he copied the stylistic manners of known actors, using the turns of fashionable tangos and other dances. He wrote songs of the "intimate genre" to be performed by Gipsy singer V. Shuysky: "The Bashful Tea Rose", "You Have Smiled at Me", "Warrant Officer Johns", and "Tango Dolores" (lyrics by P.German and O.Osenin). In 1917 he returned to Kiev, where he found work as an accompanist. In 1919, he worked at the "One-eyed Jimmy" variety theatre in Rostov-on-Don.

Military career 
In 1919–1921, Pokrass served in the First Cavalry. In honour of the taking of Rostov by the First Cavalry, he wrote the song which gained national popularity, "Budyonny's March" (1920, lyrics by A.d'Aktilj). To his fellow soldiers of the First Cavalry, he dedicated further compositions: "Hey, hey, saddle the Horses" (D. Bednogo), a cantata "Forward" and a military march, "Red Cavalrymen", both with lyrics by S.Minin.

Professional career
Relocating to Moscow in 1923, Pokrass worked in different genres of variety music. He wrote music for theatres of miniatures and a cabaret, accompanied a Gypsy chorus, the Gypsy song performers E.Dobero and O.Vargina. Pokrass tried to overcome the stale character of the variety genre in romances by using lyrics of "highbrow" poetry by Alexander Blok ("I am at Your Feet"), Igor Severyanin ("I Feel How Flowers Fall"), and others.

In 1940, Pokrass became a member of the Communist Party of the Soviet Union.

From 1923 to 1926, Pokrass served as the principal conductor and musical director of the Moscow theatres "Oriental Carpets" and "Hermitage".

In 1926-1936 he was the principal conductor and musical director of the Moscow music hall. Between 1932 and 1954 he worked in collaboration with his brother,. He composed songs, film scores, and incidental music for the theatre, as well as military marches such as the March of the Soviet Tankmen. After Daniel's death, Dmitry wrote the "March of the Motorized Infantry" (lyrics by Yevgeniy Dolmatovsky, 1957), "Great City" ("A Song about Moscow", the Newcomer's Poems, 1974), (Lyuba, Lyubushka, Lyubov; lyrics by P. Gradov), "My Small Hometown" (lyrics by M. Svetlov, 1975), "The March of BAM" (lyrics by M. Vershinin, 1975). He also composed music for the stage plays "Red Devilkins" (1950) and "Konarmiya" (1950), works for the violin, and romances.

Footnotes 

1899 births
1978 deaths
Musicians from Kyiv
People from Kievsky Uyezd
Ukrainian Jews
Soviet Jews
Communist Party of the Soviet Union members
Jewish composers
Soviet composers
Soviet male composers
Soviet film score composers
Male film score composers
20th-century composers
Jewish Ukrainian musicians
Soviet military personnel of the Russian Civil War
People's Artists of the USSR
People's Artists of the RSFSR
Stalin Prize winners
Recipients of the Order of the Red Banner of Labour
Recipients of the Order of the Red Star